Dixie Jamboree is a 1944 American film directed by Christy Cabanne.

Cast
Frances Langford as Susan Jackson
Guy Kibbee as Capt. Jackson of the 'Ellabella'
Eddie Quillan as Jeff Calhoun
Charles Butterworth as Professor
Fifi D'Orsay as Yvette
Lyle Talbot as Anthony 'Tony' Sardell
Frank Jenks as Jack 'Curly' Berger
Almira Sessions as Mrs. Ellabella Jackson, Susan's Aunt
Joe Devlin as Police Sgt.
Louise Beavers as Opal
Ben Carter as Sam the Deckhand, Ben Carter Choir Leader
Gloria Jetter as Azella, Opal's Daughter
Ward Shattuck as Henry Doakes
Ethel Shattuck as Mrs. Henry Doakes
Anthony Warde as 'Double', Phony Indian
Angelo Cruz as 'Nothing', Phony Indian

Soundtrack
Chorus - "You Ain't Right with the Lord" (Written by Michael Breen and Sam Neuman (lyrics))
Frances Langford - "The Dixie Showboat" (Written by Michael Breen and Sam Neuman (lyrics))
Frances Langford - "If It's a Dream" (Written by Michael Breen and Sam Neuman (lyrics))
Fifi d'Orsay - "No, No, No!" (Written by Michael Breen and Sam Neuman (lyrics))
Frances Langford - "Big Stuff" (Written by Michael Breen and Sam Neuman (lyrics))
Frances Langford, with trumpet solo by Eddie Quillan "If It's a Dream" (Written by Michael Breen and Sam Neuman (lyrics))

See also
List of American films of 1944

External links

1944 films
American black-and-white films
1944 musical films
Films directed by Christy Cabanne
Producers Releasing Corporation films
American musical films
1940s English-language films
1940s American films